Klown Forever (Danish: Klovn Forever) is a Danish comedy from 2015 and the successor to the cinema success Klovn - The Movie (2010). It is directed by Mikkel Nørgaard, while Casper Christensen and Frank Hvam scripted. The cast includes Casper Christensen, Frank Hvam, Mia Lyhne, Iben Hjejle, Nikolaj Coster-Waldau, Isla Fisher, and Adam Levine.

Cast
 Casper Christensen as Casper
 Frank Hvam as Frank
 Mia Lyhne as Mia 
 Iben Hjejle as Iben
 Lars Hjortshøj as Lars
 Nikolaj Coster-Waldau as himself
 Isla Fisher as herself
 Adam Levine as himself

External links
 

2015 films
Danish comedy films
2015 comedy films
2010s Danish-language films